The Richard Dimbleby Lecture (also known as the Dimbleby Lecture) is an annual television lecture founded in memory of Richard Dimbleby (1913—1965), the BBC broadcaster.

It has been delivered by an influential business, scientific or political figure almost every year since 1972 (with gaps in 1981, 1991, 1993, 2008 and 2020).

In alternate years, in more recent years, the lecture has been introduced by his sons David Dimbleby and Jonathan Dimbleby, both broadcasters for the BBC, and delivered in front of an invited audience of guests, often with a link to the specialism of the speaker.

External links
 

British lecture series
British television-related lists
1972 establishments in England
Recurring events established in 1972